Jakob Dubs (26 July 1822 – 13 January 1879) was a Swiss politician and member of the Swiss Federal Council (1861–1872).
Along with Gustave Moynier and Guillaume-Henri Dufour, he founded the Swiss Red Cross in July 1866, and served as its first President until 1872.  

He was elected to the Federal Council on 30 July 1861 and handed over office on 28 May 1872. He was affiliated to the Free Democratic Party of Switzerland.

Life and work 

During his time in political office, he was responsible for the following departments:
Department of Justice and Police (1861–1863)
Political Department (1864)
Department of Home Affairs (1865)
Department of Justice and Police (1866)
Department of Posts (1867)
Political Department (1868)
Department of Posts (1869)
Political Department (1870)
Department of Home Affairs (1871–1872)
He was President of the Confederation three times in 1864, 1868 and 1870.

External links

1822 births
1879 deaths
People from Affoltern District
Swiss Calvinist and Reformed Christians
Free Democratic Party of Switzerland politicians
Foreign ministers of Switzerland
Members of the Federal Council (Switzerland)
Members of the National Council (Switzerland)
Presidents of the National Council (Switzerland)
Members of the Council of States (Switzerland)
Presidents of the Council of States (Switzerland)
Federal Supreme Court of Switzerland judges
19th-century Swiss judges
19th-century Swiss politicians